Karta GPS is a mobile application developed by Karta Software Technologies Lda., a daughter company of NDrive, for the Android, iOS and iPadOS operating systems. It is distributed for free and pairs open-source map data from OpenStreetMap alongside curated content from Yelp and Foursquare.

The application does not require a connection to the Internet (e.g. 3G, 4G, WiFi, etc.) and uses a GPS satellite connection to determine its location. Routes are calculated and plotted based on real-time traffic information provided by Inrix.

History 
The application's beta release was released on 4 November 2016. On 19 May 2017, Karta GPS featured both Bill Clinton and Donald Trump's voices in its selection of navigation voice overs.

Features 

Offline maps and guidance: all maps can be downloaded for free. No internet is required for searching, route calculation or turn-by-turn instructions.
 Search: one box search supports partial names, initials and can search points of interest, street names, crossing streets, GPS coordinates and address points.
 Traffic: the application shows the route layered with different colors based on the current traffic along the route. Live traffic service finds faster routes and aims to avoid traffic jams.
 Suggestions: point of interest content drawn from Yelp and Foursquare to Karta GPS maps (such as the ten best nearby restaurants), allows users to "explore" a location's top-rated places of entertainment, their descriptions, their last three reviews, photos, and their opening hours and prices.
Car & Walking: provides navigation for both car and pedestrians.

See also 
 Comparison of commercial GPS software

Resources 
 Karta GPS Official website
 Karta GPS on Apple App Store
 Karta GPS on Google Play

References 

Companies established in 2001
IOS software
Mobile route-planning software
Navigation system companies
Portuguese brands